Penthesilea is a genus of moths in the family Pyralidae.

Species
Penthesilea difficilis (C. Felder, R. Felder & Rogenhofer, 1875)
Penthesilea sacculalis Ragonot, 1891

References

Chrysauginae
Pyralidae genera
Taxa named by Émile Louis Ragonot